Mark Jefferson may refer to:

 Mark Jefferson (geographer) (1863–1949), American geographer and cartographer
 Mark Jefferson (cricketer) (born 1976), New Zealand cricketer